Rohru is a town and a municipal committee in Shimla district in the Indian state of Himachal Pradesh. It is at the banks of the Pabbar River, and it is about 115 km from Shimla city. It has an average elevation of 1,525  metres (5,003 feet).

Demographics

 India census, Rohru had a population of 14953. Males constitute 59% of the population and females 41%. Rohru has an average literacy rate of 94%, much higher than the national average of 59.5%: male literacy is 96%, and female literacy is 89%. In Rohru, 13% of the population is under 6 years of age.

References

Cities and towns in Shimla district